Warren Clarke (born Alan James Clarke; 26 April 1947 – 12 November 2014) was an English actor. He appeared in many films after a significant role as Dim in Stanley Kubrick's A Clockwork Orange. His television appearances included Dalziel and Pascoe (as Detective Superintendent Andy Dalziel), The Manageress and Sleepers.

Early life
Clarke was born in Oldham, Lancashire. His father worked as a stained-glass maker and his mother as a secretary.
He left Barlow Hall Secondary Modern School, Chorlton-cum-Hardy, Manchester, aged 15 and began work at the Manchester Evening News as a copy boy. He later moved on to amateur dramatics and performed at Huddersfield Rep before working as an actor full-time. During this period he also decided to change his first name to Warren, a name he chose as his girlfriend of the time had a crush on Warren Beatty.

Career
Clarke's first television appearance was in the long-running Granada soap opera Coronation Street, initially as Kenny Pickup in 1966 and then as Gary Bailey in 1968. His first major film appearance was in Stanley Kubrick's A Clockwork Orange (1971) where he played a "droog" named Dim opposite Malcolm McDowell. He appeared with McDowell again in the film O Lucky Man! (1973) and in the TV film Gulag (1985).

Clarke appeared in a wide range of roles in television and film productions including The Breaking of Bumbo (1970), Home (1970) opposite Sir Ralph Richardson and Sir John Gielgud, Charlton Heston's Antony and Cleopatra (1972), Jennie: Lady Randolph Churchill (1972), "The Frighteners", (ep.4.The Minder), (1974), Tinker Tailor Soldier Spy (1979), S.O.S. Titanic (1979), ‘’Hammer House of Horror,(se1ep2) (1980), Hawk the Slayer (1980), Masada (1981), Enigma (1982), Lassiter (1984), Top Secret! (1984), Ishtar (1987) and I.D. (1995). He played a Russian dissident in Clint Eastwood's Firefox (1982).

In Granada Television's series The Jewel in the Crown (1984) Clarke played the role of the overtly homosexual 'Sophie' Dixon, and he was Colonel Krieger in the first series of LWT's Wish Me Luck (1988). In 1989 Clarke played Captain Lee in the film Crusoe. The same year he played the role of Martin Fisher, the chairman of a football club, in The Manageress and the role of Managing Director of an engineering firm, Vic Wilcox, in the TV adaptation of the David Lodge novel Nice Work. He also starred in an episode of Lovejoy entitled "Bin Diving". In 1990 he appeared in the episode "Odi, et Amo" of the situation comedy Chelmsford 123.  He played Larry Patterson in Gone to the Dogs (1991), which was followed by the series Gone to Seed (1992), in which Clarke again starred.  He also appeared in Our Mutual Friend (the 1976 TV mini-series) as Bradley Headstone.

In Sleepers (1991), alongside Nigel Havers, Clarke played one of the two lead roles as two KGB sleeper agents living in Britain and leading their own lives until they are reactivated. He played Bamber in the ITV comedy-drama Moving Story (1994). His comedic talents can be seen in the one-off special Blackadder: The Cavalier Years, in which he played Oliver Cromwell and in the episode "Amy and Amiability" of the series Blackadder the Third.

Beginning in 1996, he starred for 11 series as Detective Superintendent Andy Dalziel in the TV series Dalziel and Pascoe, based on the crime novels of Reginald Hill.

In 1997 he starred in the drama The Locksmith. Between 2000 and 2003, Clarke played Brian Addis, a father who moved his family from the bustle of London to a Devon farm, in the BBC TV series Down to Earth. He appeared as Mr Boythorn in the BBC One dramatisation of Bleak House (2005) and starred alongside Anthony Head in the BBC Drama The Invisibles (2008) and in the Channel 4 trilogy Red Riding (2009).

Around the same time, Clarke appeared as Commander Peters in the ITV production of Agatha Christie's Marple Why Didn't They Ask Evans? (2009). In 2010 he guested in ITV series Lewis ("Dark Matter"), Chuggington (2010), the BBC series Inspector George Gently ("Peace and Love", 2010) and played Mr Bott in the BBC's Just William. He guested as innkeeper Samuel Quested in Midsomer Murders ("The Night of the Stag", 2011) and as John Lacey in Call the Midwife (also 2011).

In 2014 he began filming Poldark as Charles Poldark. The character's final scene in the series, in episode four in which Poldark lies on his deathbed before dying, was also Clarke's final scene as an actor: he was very ill at the time of filming and died a few weeks later; the first episode of the television series was then dedicated to his memory.

Personal life
Clarke was a keen golfer and had been a Manchester City supporter from the age of seven.

Clarke's marriage to his first wife ended in divorce a few years after his parents died. They had a son together, Rowan. He had a daughter, Georgia, by his second wife, Michelle.

Clarke lost money by investing in the 2013 action film The Numbers Station. On 12 November 2014 Clarke died in his sleep, after a short illness. He lived in Beaconsfield, Buckinghamshire.

Filmography

References

External links
 

1947 births
2014 deaths
English male film actors
English male television actors
Male actors from Oldham
20th-century English male actors
21st-century English male actors